Conley Run is a stream in the U.S. state of West Virginia.

Conley Run most likely was named after Darby Connolly, a settler who was killed by Indians.

See also
List of rivers of West Virginia

References

Rivers of Randolph County, West Virginia
Rivers of West Virginia